The energy mix is a group of different primary energy sources from which secondary energy for direct use - such as electricity - is produced. Energy mix refers to all direct uses of energy, such as transportation and housing, and should not be confused with power generation mix, which refers only to generation of electricity.

Global energy mix
According to the International Energy Agency (IEA) 13.6% of world primary energy was used by the European Union (EU). Within the EU, 75.9% came from fossil fuels, 14.1% from nuclear power, 7% from biofuels, 2.9 from renewable energy resources.

Overall primary energy consumption in the United States in 2015 relied most on petroleum, natural gas and coal. Renewables contributed  and nuclear power .
In the same year, about 4 million GWh of electricity were generated in the United States, 67% of which was generated from fossil fuels (coal, natural gas, and <1% petroleum), 20% from nuclear power, 6% hydropower and 7% other renewables.

In 2018, the global primary energy source was about 80% fossil fuels: (33.6% oil, 27.2% coal, 23.9% natural gas), 6.8% hydro, 4.4% nuclear, and 4% other renewables, such as wind, thermal, bioenergies, solar, and waste. Energy consumption worldwide rose 2.9%, which is the largest increase since 2010. Europe used less oil than the global percentage, and more nuclear and renewable resources, with France using less gas and more nuclear. North America had the highest consumption per resident, with Russia in second, and Europe and the Middle East following. While North America used 240 gigajoules per capita, Africa used only 15 gigajoules per capita.

Sustainability
As energy consumption rises, attention has turned to more environmentally sustainable practices. 2018 saw the largest increase in worldwide energy consumption since 2010, with 27.2% of that energy coming from coal. The carbon dioxide released when coal is burned to produce energy accounts for 44% of the world's carbon emissions. Petroleum use accounts for nearly 1/3 of the world's carbon emissions. These factors contribute to the global temperature increase.

Many countries, such as Pakistan and Malaysia have begun developing options for more sustainable energy practices. Some of these options include wind, for small to medium-sized projects; solar power; and biomass, which is energy produced from waste products such as rice husks, animal waste, and crop residue.

The IEA has developed a plan, called the Sustainable Development Scenario (SDS), which would lead to an 800 Mtoe decrease in global energy consumption by utilizing changes in the sectors of residential and transport energy. Following this scenario, fossil fuel usage would drop significantly, but it would require a dramatic increase of use of renewable resources, particularly in Asia.

See also

World energy supply and consumption
Energy development
Energy consumption
Energy independence
Efficient energy use
Energy transition
Fossil fuel phase-out
Fossil fuels lobby
Fuel mix disclosure

References

Electricity
Energy development
Energy sources
Energy production